Kamenka is a rural locality (a selo) in Baychurovskoye Rural Settlement, Povorinsky District, Voronezh Oblast, Russia. The population was 397 as of 2010. There are 3 streets.

Geography 
Kamenka is located 48 km northeast of Povorino (the district's administrative centre) by road. Baychurovo is the nearest rural locality.

References 

Rural localities in Povorinsky District